Tracy Scroggins (born September 11, 1969) is a former professional football athlete. He was a linebacker in the National Football League (NFL). He spent his entire 10-year NFL career playing for the Detroit Lions.

Early life
Scroggins attended high school at Checotah High School in Checotah, Oklahoma.

College career
Scroggins attended Coffeyville Community College. He graduated from the University of Tulsa.

Career
Scroggins played for the Detroit Lions football team for ten seasons.

1969 births
Living people
People from Checotah, Oklahoma
Detroit Lions players
American football linebackers
American football defensive ends
Coffeyville Red Ravens football players
Tulsa Golden Hurricane football players